Didier Stil (born 13 August 1964) is a French bobsledder. He competed in the four man event at the 1992 Winter Olympics.

References

1964 births
Living people
French male bobsledders
Olympic bobsledders of France
Bobsledders at the 1992 Winter Olympics
People from Sainte-Adresse
Sportspeople from Seine-Maritime